Alexandra de Faria Marzo (born September 26, 1968, in Rio de Janeiro, Brazil) is a former Brazilian actress and screenwriter.

She is also the daughter of the actors Cláudio Marzo and Betty Faria. She has a daughter named Giulia.

Career

Television

Films

External links

1968 births
Living people
Brazilian telenovela actresses
People from Rio de Janeiro (city)
Brazilian stage actresses
Brazilian film actresses